Maccabi (sometimes spelled Macabi, Makabi or Makkabi) may refer to:

 The Maccabi World Union, Maccabiah Games or any one of the following sport organizations around the world:

Makabi Warszawa, founded in 1915 in Warsaw, Poland

References

List
Lists of sports organizations
Judaism-related lists